This is a list of state visits made by Stevo Pendarovski, the 5th President of North Macedonia since May 2019.

List of State Visits

State visits hosted in North Macedonia by Stevo Pendarovski

References

State visits by Macedonian leaders
Politics of North Macedonia
North Macedonia politics-related lists
Diplomatic visits by heads of state